Lecanora xylophila is a crustose lichen in the family Lecanoraceae, first described by Auguste-Marie Hue in 1915.

See also
 List of Lecanora species

References

External links
Lecanora xylophila: images and occurrence data from GBIF

xylophila
Lichen species
Lichens described in 1915